Boxing at the 1984 Summer Olympics took place in the Memorial Sports Arena in Los Angeles, California, United States. The boxing schedule began on July 29 and ended on August 11. Twelve boxing events were contested with the participation of 354 fighters from 81 countries.  A Soviet-led boycott resulted in the withdrawals of the Soviet Union, Cuba, East Germany, Bulgaria and other Eastern Bloc nations from boxing competitions.

At the 1980 Summer Olympics, that was impacted by an American-led boycott, Cuban boxers won 10 medals, with 6 of them being gold, and had again been expected to do well. However, the nation withdrew from the games following the announcement of the Soviet boycott. Teófilo Stevenson, who was going to try for his fourth Olympic gold medal before the boycott was officially announced, had previously defeated Tyrell Biggs twice (one by knockout) and Hermenegildo Báez had previously defeated Henry Tillman. Soviet Alexander Yagubkin defeated both Biggs and Tillman during the USA–USSR duals. Cuban and Soviet boxers, however, were more seasoned than their American counterparts. While US athletes typically turned pro after the Olympics, while still in their early twenties, Cubans and the Soviets were not allowed to do so and stayed on in the amateurs, participating in multiple Olympic cycles.

Evander Holyfield was controversially disqualified in the Light heavyweight semifinals for punching New Zealand boxer Kevin Barry after what seemed to be a stop. However, replay shows that the referee stopped the bout after his punches. Under IABA health regulation Barry was not allowed to box for 28 days, so he was scratched from the final, giving Yugoslav boxer Anton Josipović the uncontested gold medal. During the medal ceremony, Josipović pulled bronze medalist Holyfield onto the highest step of the podium and raised his hand, acknowledging that Holyfield deserved to compete in the final.

Due to the increasing size of heavyweight boxers (which put lighter heavyweights at a disadvantage), the Heavyweight division was split in two. The boxers above 200 pounds, were placed in the newly created Super Heavyweight division.

Medal table

Medal summary

See also
 Boxing at the Friendship Games

References

External links
 Official results
 Amateur Boxing

 
1984
1984 Summer Olympics events
1984 in boxing
International boxing competitions hosted by the United States
Boxing in Los Angeles